David Waters may refer to: David Waters, Journalist

David Waters (actor), (born; 1948) British Australian film, television and stage actor
David Waters, the killer of the American atheist activist Madalyn Murray O'Hair
Dave Waters (wrestler), member of the UK Pitbulls
David Watkin Waters, British naval historian